Jitendra Nath Pande or J. N. Pande (14 June 1941 – 23 May 2020) was an Indian Pulmonologist and Professor and Head of Medicine at the All India Institute of Medical Studies (AIIMS). He was working as Senior Consultant (Medicine) at Sitaram Bhartia Institute of Science & Research, New Delhi. He died on 23 May 2020 during sleep when he was home quarantined due to COVID-19 positivity during the COVID-19 pandemic in India, in New Delhi.

He was posthumously awarded India's fourth highest civilian award, the Padma Shri in 2021.

Personal and family details
Pande was born in Shikohabad, India, to Shri Madan Mohan Pande and Smt. Kamla Devi Pande. His parents were from Uttar Pradesh.

He was younger brother of Prof. Gyan N Pande, Emeritus Professor, Swansea University and President, International Centre for Computational Engineering.

Education
Pande obtained both his MBBS in 1963 and MD (Medicine) in 1966 degrees from AIIMS, New Delhi.

Work and important assignments
Pande specialised in Respiratory Medicine and Clinical Epidemiology. He setup first intensive care unit in India.

He treated many famous personalities from public life like President of India, Prime Minister of India, politicians, etc. Some of his famous patients are former Power Minister Rangarajan Kumaramangalam, Raj Kapoor.

Important assignments of Pande include:
 Personal doctor to the President of India.
 Director Clinical Epidemiology Unit, All India Institute Medical Sciences, New Delhi
 Chief, SRB Center of Clinical Pharmacology, Department of Medicine, All India Institute Medical Sciences, New Delhi
 Head, Department of Medicine, All India Institute of Medical Sciences, New Delhi
 Professor, All India Institute of Medical Sciences, New Delhi
 Associate Professor, All India Institute Medical Sciences, New Delhi
 Assistant Professor, All India Institute Medical Sciences, New Delhi
 Member, Review Committee Bhopal Gas Disaster.

Research impact
The 1997-98 study of Pande titled 'Outdoor air pollution and emergency room visits
at a hospital in Delhi' was cited by Supreme Court of India in its CNG judgement.

Publication
Pande published more than 170 papers in national and international journals apart from delivering many prestigious orations.

Awards
Pande was conferred many prestigious awards, some of them are mentioned below:
 Padma Shri by Government of India
 Emeritus Professor by National Academy of Medical Sciences
 Ranbaxy Science by Foundation Award
 Sri Omprakash Bhasin by Foundation Award in Health and Technology

Honors
 Council Member, National Academy of Medical Sciences.
 Fellow, National Academy of Medical Sciences.
 Fellow, National Academy of Sciences
 Guest Editor, The Indian Journal of Medical Research (IJMR)
 Speaker, NCCP (I) – Prof. Raman Vishwanathan Memorial Chest Oration, Amritsar, 1995 (Previously known as Raman Vishwanathan Memorial Oration / Lecture)
 Fellow, National College Chest Physicians
 Member, Indian Council Medical Research
 Vice President, Chest Institute
 Member, Chest Institute
 Vice President, Indian Council Medical Research
 Editor, Indian Journal Chest Diseases and Allied Sciences
 Editor, Annals of National Academy Medical Sciences

References

2020 deaths
1941 births
Indian medical educators
20th-century Indian medical doctors
Indian medical writers
Indian public health doctors
Academic staff of the All India Institute of Medical Sciences, New Delhi
All India Institute of Medical Sciences, New Delhi alumni
Fellows of The National Academy of Sciences, India
Fellows of the National Academy of Medical Sciences
People from Firozabad district
Medical doctors from Uttar Pradesh
Deaths from the COVID-19 pandemic in India
Recipients of the Padma Shri in medicine
Indian medical administrators
Indian medical academics